Ismail Ismaili (born 14 November 1981) is an ethnic Albanian footballer from North Macedonia, who last played for FK Rufeja.

Club career
Ismaili played over 200 games in the Macedonian league, winning the title in 2010 with Renova. Ismaili scored for FK Renova in a 2011 UEFA Cup qualifying match against Glentoran, but his side went out 3-3 on penalties.

International career
He made his senior debut for North Macedonia in a June 2005 FIFA World Cup qualification match away against Armenia and has earned a total of 2 caps, scoring no goals. His second and final international was a March 2006 friendly match against Bulgaria.

References

External links
 

1981 births
Living people
Sportspeople from Tetovo
Albanian footballers from North Macedonia
Association football forwards
Macedonian footballers
North Macedonia international footballers
KF Shkëndija players
NK Pomorac 1921 players
FK Makedonija Gjorče Petrov players
FK Renova players
FK Zajazi players
Macedonian First Football League players
Croatian Football League players
Macedonian Second Football League players
Macedonian expatriate footballers
Expatriate footballers in Croatia
Macedonian expatriate sportspeople in Croatia
Macedonian football managers